Kraft Singles is a brand of processed cheese product manufactured and sold by Kraft Foods, introduced in 1950. Kraft individually wrapped "slices" are not really slices off a block, but formed separately in manufacturing. In the US, Kraft Singles is manufactured in regular, 2% Milk, and Fat Free. In Australia, a short-lived product called Vegemite Singles combined Kraft Singles and Vegemite.

Kraft singles do not qualify for the US FDA Pasteurized Processed Cheese labeling. For this reason, Kraft labels them Pasteurized Prepared Cheese Product to avoid FDA sanctions. Kraft Foods called their Kraft Singles as "Pasteurized Processed Cheese Food" until the FDA gave a warning in December 2002 stating that the product could not be legally labeled as "Pasteurized Processed Cheese Food" due to the inclusion of milk protein concentrates.  Kraft complied with the FDA order by changing the label to the current Pasteurized Prepared Cheese Product.

One of the more famous ad campaigns involved the claim that each ¾ ounce slice contained "five ounces of milk", which makes them taste better than imitation cheese slices made mostly with vegetable oil and water and hardly any milk. The campaign was lambasted for its implications that each slice contained the same amount of calcium as a five-ounce glass of milk and also more calcium than imitation cheese slices, which eventually led to a ruling by the Federal Trade Commission in 1992 that ordered Kraft to stop making false claims in its advertising.

In Australia, the Kraft branding was retired in 2017. Kraft's successor company in Australia, Mondelez, sold their cheese products line to Bega Cheese, but retained rights to the Kraft name.  Bega switched the name of their sliced cheese product from "Kraft Singles" to "Dairylea Slices", as Bega acquired the rights to the Dairylea brand in Australia in the deal. The "Kraft Singles" name could return in the future, as Kraft Heinz assumed the trademark from Mondelez at the beginning of 2018.

In America, consumers are slowly moving away from Kraft Singles; though around 40 percent of households in America continue to buy Kraft Singles, sales are flat.

References

External links

FDA Cheese product definitions

Processed cheese
Kraft Foods brands
American cheeses
Products introduced in 1950